Esprit De Four is the 12th studio album by Fourplay, released in 2012.

Track listing
 "December Dream " (Chuck Loeb) – 7:46
 "Firefly" (Nathan East, Tom Keane) – 4:12	
 "Venus" (Harvey Mason, Sr.) – 7:11
 "Sonnymoon" (Chuck Loeb) – 4:12
 "Put Our Hearts Together [Instrumental Version]" (Bob James, Hillary James) – 6:08
 "All I Wanna Do" (Nathan East, Tom Keane) – 4:16
 "Logic of Love" (Chuck Loeb) – 7:05
 "Esprit de Four" (Jerry Peters, Harvey Mason, Sr.) – 6:22
 "Sugoi" (Bob James) – 4:26
 "Put Our Hearts Together [Vocal Track]" (Bob James, Hillary James) – 3:18

Personnel
 Bob James – keyboards
 Chuck Loeb – guitar, synthesizer
 Nathan East – bass guitar, vocals
 Harvey Mason – drums, synthesizer
 Tom Keane – guitar
 Lizzy Loeb – vocals
 Seiko Matsuda – vocals

Chart performance

Album charts

Single charts

References 

Fourplay albums
2012 albums